The Skinners' Kent Academy (formerly Sandown Court then later renamed to Tunbridge Wells High School) is a secondary school with academy status in Royal Tunbridge Wells. The academy is rated outstanding by Ofsted.

Tunbridge Wells High School became The Skinners' Kent Academy in September 2009, when the school became an academy, and independent of local authority control.

History
The original school was called Sandown Court and was opened in 1968. It was then renamed to Tunbridge Wells High School which closed on the 31st August 2009 and was then renamed to Skinners Kent Academy. 2010 was when the new building was built. Before In the five years before becoming an academy, the school was consistently ranked in the top 5% nationally for adding value and was the top secondary school in West Kent based on CVA scores.

In September 2010, it was on the shortlist for the 2010 Kent Design Awards.

Curriculum
The school offers the International Baccalaureate Middle Years Programme (Years 7-9) and Career-related Programme (Sixth Form). While all maintained schools in England must follow the National Curriculum, and are inspected by Ofsted on how well they succeed in delivering a 'broad and balanced curriculum'. Schools endeavour to get all students to achieve the English Baccalaureate(EBACC) qualification- this must include core subjects a modern or ancient foreign language, and either History or Geography.

The Skinners' Kent Academy does this within the framework of the IB Middle Years Programme. Up until this year Kent Academy operated a two-year, Key Stage 3 where all the core National Curriculum subjects are taught, followed for three years preparing for GCSE exams. This was reversed on the intervention of Ofsted who announced that was not the intention and were restricting the target 'outstanding grade' to schools who followed the traditional path. 

In 10 and 11, that is in Key Stage 4 students study a core of English Language, English Literature, Mathematics, Science, Core PE , PSHE  (Sex and Relationship Education with Enterprise  Education)) and Religious Education. All students do French.  History is more popular than geography, Computing/Computer/Science are taken in equal numbers by a third of year group each. The English Baccalaureate is achieved by 61% of the students against 40% nationally.

Buildings
The old buildings were replaced in 2010 with an award-winning design. The contractors were Willmott Dixon. It is based on a four-storey hub building with three three-storey rectangular teaching blocks set at 45’ to each other, and a further large sports block opposite.

The school required extra capacity to host its new one form entry, 3-11 primary school. They worked closely with KCC and the appointed contractors, Baxall Construction. It is a bespoke two-storey timberframed, sustainable, offsite, factory construction. The building was designed using 3D CAD software, by Willmott Dixon in discussion with the staff. The components which included the floors and the walls with the windows already in place, were all delivered at the same time as flat packs on lorries.

Non-Selective Entry Criteria
The Skinners' Kent Academy is the only one of the five secondary schools in the borough of Tunbridge Wells that does not impose any entry criteria other than the child living within a reasonable travelling distance to the school.

The three local grammar schools select their Year 7 intake according to the child's academic achievement or aptitude as measured in the "eleven plus" examination. In the case of the two other local secondary schools: Bennett Memorial Diocesan School requires to provide evidence that their family regularly participates in an act of collective Anglican worship and St. Gregory's Catholic School selects its pupil intake mainly from nearby Catholic feeder primary schools.

References

External links
The Skinners' Kent Academy official website
Promotional video- with footage of the 'houses'
Wilmot Dixon cgi tour of the school
Official virtual tour of the school 2020

Secondary schools in Kent
Schools in Royal Tunbridge Wells
Academies in Kent
International Baccalaureate schools in England